The Zee Cine Award Best Male Debut is chosen by the jury. They give awards to the new discoveries of Bollywood where they see some potential. This Category was first awarded in the year 2001. The first recipient was Hritik Roshan for his performance in Kaho Naa... Pyaar Hai.

The winners are listed below:-

See also 
 Zee Cine Awards
 Bollywood
 Cinema of India

Zee Cine Awards
Film awards for male debut actors